C. R. Parameswaran (born 1950) is a Malayalam novelist and essayist from Kerala, India.

Life

Parameswaran was born in Meloor, near Chalakudy in August 1950 to KP Raman Nambidi and CK Amminni. He completed his education from Kalady, Irinjalakuda and Agra. He has completed his post-graduate degree in English language and literature. As a teacher at the Indian Air Force, he graduated with a degree in English teaching from the Hyderabad Central Institute of English. He has worked in Delhi, Belgaum, Bangalore and Cochin.

He retired from the Income tax department as a Deputy commissioner.

Literary activities
Parameswaran began writing poems and stories as a university student. He won the first prize in the poetry competitions conducted by Kerala University in 1969 and 1970, and the first prize in a poetry and drama competition conducted by Mathrubhumi in 1971. His first novel initiative Prakriti Niyamam won the Kerala Sahitya Akademi Award for Novel in 1989 and the work Vamsha Chihnangal won the Kerala Sahitya Akademi Award for Literary Criticism in 2015.

Works
 Prakriti Niyamam (പ്രകൃതിനിയമം)
 Vamsha Chihnangal (വംശചിഹ്നങ്ങൾ)
 Mounathinte Shampalam Maranam (മൌനത്തിൻറെ ശമ്പളം മരണം)
 Veruppu Bhakshikkumpol (വെറുപ്പ്‌ ഭക്ഷിക്കുമ്പോൾ)
 Vipal Sandeshangal (വിപൽ സന്ദേശങ്ങൾ)
 Asahishnuthayude Avashyam (അസഹിഷ്‌ണുതയുടെ ആവശ്യം)
 Ningalude Chodyangal (നിങ്ങളുടെ ചോദ്യങ്ങൾ)
 Nammude Avasavyavastha (നമ്മുടെ ആവാസവ്യവസ്ഥ)
 Ente Ezhupathukal (എന്റെ എഴുപതുകൾ)

References

1950 births
Living people
Novelists from Kerala
Malayali people
People from Thrissur district
Writers from Thrissur
Indian male novelists
Malayalam-language writers
Malayalam novelists
Recipients of the Kerala Sahitya Akademi Award
20th-century Indian novelists
21st-century Indian novelists
20th-century Indian essayists
21st-century Indian essayists
Indian male essayists
20th-century Indian male writers
21st-century Indian male writers